The Thomas Champ House near Paris, Kentucky was built in 1825.  It was listed on the National Register of Historic Places in 2003.

It is located on Lexington and Maysville Rd. (U.S. Route 68).  It has also been known as Sulpher Spring Farm and as Long Champ Farm.  It includes two contributing buildings and a contributing site.

It includes a main house, a smokehouse, a cemetery, a garage, and a pair of entrance gates.

References

Houses on the National Register of Historic Places in Kentucky
Federal architecture in Kentucky
Houses completed in 1825
National Register of Historic Places in Bourbon County, Kentucky
1825 establishments in Kentucky